Shut Up and Shoot! is a 2006 comedy film directed by Silvio Pollio and starring Silvio Pollio, Joe Cortese, Tom Sizemore, Gary Busey and John Savage.

Plot
A crooked Hollywood producer finally gets what's coming to him when his plans to kill off his associates creates a surprising twist of events in this wild west Hollywood tale.

Cast
Silvio Pollio
Joe Cortese
Tom Sizemore
Gary Busey  
John Savage

Release
The film was released in USA on 27 June 2006.

References

External links

2006 films
2006 comedy films
2006 independent films
American independent films
American comedy films
2000s American films